The University of the State of Paraná (Unespar) is an institution of higher education administered by the Government of the state of Paraná, with a headquartered  in the city of Paranavaí, It has campuses in the cities of Curitiba, Apucarana, Campo Mourão, Paranaguá, Paranavaí, São José dos Pinhais and União da Vitória, created by State Law nº 13.283, on October 25, 2001, changed by State law nº 13.358 on December 21, 2001, State Law nº 15.300 on September 28, 2006, and by State Law nº 17.590 on June 12, 2013. It is affiliated with the Science, Technology and Higher Education's Secretary of State.

The Unespar Institution is one of the seven public state universities of Paraná, spread in seven campuses and the Guatupê's Militar Police Academy's Public Security's Higher School, special unity, academically linked to Unespar. The agents and teaching staff are 1.077 people who attend to more than 12.000 students in graduate and postgraduate studies courses.

The selection of students in Unespar is held once a year in the university entrance exam and also the Unified Selection System (SiSU). Of the vacancies, 50% are reserved for the SiSU except to arts courses that require specific skill test, and the other half by the traditional model selection.

Campuses

Apucarana

Apucarana has been experiencing the value of higher education for at least 56 years. After the implementation of the State College of Economics of Apucarana, the city administrators brainstormed and went on meet the demands of the population, the region and several cities of Paraná, Bahia, Santa Catarina, Rio de Janeiro, Rondônia, Ceará, Minas Gerais and São Paulo by offering more undergraduate courses.

Seven of the courses, the older ones, are part of the Center for Applied Social Sciences. They are: Administration, Accounting, Computer Science, Economics, Trilingual Executive Secretary, Social Services and Tourism.

On the other hand, the Center for Humanities and Education has the newest courses for teacher training. The course of Mathematics, for example, formed the first professionals in 2015. The Education/Pedagogy and Literature courses (English, Spanish and Portuguese) have been operational since 2013.

All 12 courses totaling 1755 students. In addition to teaching, professors develop and support the academic community involvement in research and extension projects. These actions allow the personal and professional development of academics as well as a positive impact in the community where they operate.

Campo Mourão

Formerly college Science and Literature of Campo Mourão, is now home of the campus of Campo Mourão of Unespar, it was the first institution of higher education in the municipality and the region where it is located. The first steps towards the implementation took place in 1964. After a period paralyzed in 1967 instituted the Educational Foundation of Campo Mourão. However, it was on August 24, 1972, that became a college. The inaugural lecture took place almost two years later, on June 8, 1974.

Among the ten available courses, five are major degrees (Geography, History, Literature, Mathematics and Pedagogy) and five are bachelor's degrees (Administration, Accounting, Economics, Agro industrial Production Engineering and Tourism and Environment).

In addition to undergraduate courses, the campus stands out for being the first institution to offer graduate in broad terms in strict sense COMCAM. The Graduate Program Interdisciplinary Society and Development (PPGSeD) already has two master classes. The latest approval is the Professional Master's Program in History that is initiation the selection of students for 2016. Also, there are two other proposals in the fields of Geography and History.

Curitiba I

Curitiba campus was the first state school of higher education of Paraná. Created in 1948 as the School of Music and Fine Arts of Paraná, is affectionately called "Belas" and is constituted as cultural heritage. The foundation is the result of a movement of artists and lovers of art and culture in Paraná.

It has approximately 1.250 undergraduate, specialization and extension students. Currently it occupies three buildings in central Curitiba, where it they have graduated musicians and visual artists over 67 years.

There are two undergraduate programs (Visual Arts and Music) and six bachelors (Singing, Instrument, Composition and Conducting, Painting, Sculpture and Engraving).

Curitiba II

The College of Arts of Paraná, today called Curitiba campus II Unespar, is one of the few higher education institutions in Brazil to offer courses in various artistic disciplines.

Founded in 1916 by conductor Leonard Kessler as the Paraná Conservatory of Music became, in the first few years, a reference in the training of musicians in the South. However, in 2005, a new profile is draw with the opening of the course Film and Video.

There are three graduation courses (Visual Arts, Music, Theatre) and five bachelor's degrees (Music, Music Therapy, Performing Arts, Cinema and AudioVisual, Dance). Dance is included in both a bachelor's degree and a graduation course.

Paranaguá

This is the only State University in the coast of Paraná, Paranaguá campus has a long story to tell from the creation of the then State College of Philosophy, Sciences and Letters of Paranaguá in 1956 and start of activities on February 3, 1960.

History, Mathematics, Education and Languages (Portuguese and English) are the first courses offered on-campus and still exist. A bachelor of Business Administration and Accounting are in operation since 1981. The most recent course, which provides the choice of morning or afternoon classes, is the Biological Sciences which began operating in 2005 as a bachelor's degree.

Located in Paranaguá has a total of 2.000 students who are involved also in research and extension activities.

Paranavaí

When Unespar was created, the State Faculty of Education, Sciences and Letters Paranavaí became one of the seven campuses of the institution. It was founded in 1965 as a tool for training of professionals in higher education and reduction of cultural deficiencies of the region where it is located.

In addition to forming Paraná professionals from different municipalities, the campus also has students from São Paulo and Mato Grosso do Sul. It stands out and contributes significantly to local development, regional, state and nationwide.

To promote the primary objective of regional integration, it has 11 undergraduate programs that focus in teaching, research and extension. Health courses, Nursing and Physical Education are offered only on campus and they represent the toughest competition in the admission process.
On the other hand, because of the period of activity, courses such as Management, Accounting, Biological Sciences, Geography, History, Literature, Mathematics, Education and Social Services became great references.

Amongst the campus differentials they also offer graduate programs at the master's level in “Education: Training interdisciplinary Teaching” which aim to provide scientific development opportunity for teacher training, this is already in its third group of graduated students.

União da Vitória
It offers nine courses, all in the undergraduate area, the União da Vitória campus has been training teachers with excellence for over five decades. It was founded as College in Philosophy, Sciences and Letters of União da Vitória in 1956. It servers a community mainly in the South of Paraná State and Northern Santa Catarina State. This makes this campus, as well as other campuses, pioneers in higher education outside the state capital.

The faculty has professors with Post-PhDs, PhDs, Master's degrees, and Specialists who offer teaching support, research and extension benefiting 1.302 students in the courses of Biological Sciences, Philosophy, Geography, History, Letters (English and Spanish), Mathematics, Pedagogy and Chemistry.

Research Strength
Unespar counts on 62 groups of Research registered on CNPq's Directory, certificates by the institution and are distributed in the following areas of knowledge: Agricultural Sciences (01), Biological Sciences (03), Health Sciences (03), Exact Sciences and of the Earth (07), Human Sciences (18), Applied Social Sciences (05), Engineering (01), Linguistic, Languages and Arts (24).

The Unespar Groups of Research's work has contributed to the improvement of the research, the spread of produced knowledge, the interchange with other Institutions of higher Education and Centers of Research, as well for the formation of human resources.

Furthermore, the Groups of Research have contributed with the actions of the working postgraduation studies programs, as well the fortification of the Work Groups for the creation of new postgraduation studies Stricto Sensu's Programs.

Unespar also counts on 11 regular scientific periodical of the different areas of knowledge, in the website of postgraduation studies and Research's Dean's office. As part of the politics of support to the scientific magazines, courses and events were promoted for the graduation of the editors and members of the Editorial Counsel, in order to qualify the regular and expand the disclosure.

Extension Projects
Unespar performs programs, projects, study groups, courses and extension events in order to pursue integration between theory and practice, turning into an instrument of transformation and integration between the university and society, in the following areas of knowledge: Agricultural Sciences, Biological Sciences, Health Sciences, Exact Sciences and of the Earth, Human Sciences, Applied Social Sciences, Engineering, Linguistic, Languages and Arts.

Among the developed Programs includes the Boundaries University, the Institutional Program of Scholarships for University Extension, Art at School, Contemporary Music and Extension in Music, Employer, Good Deal Paraná, University Opened to the Elderly, Educational Development Program, Productivity Scholarships Program in Research and Technological Development/Extension and the Language Center.

The institutional calendar also counts on events such as workshops, courses, show, film clubs, seminars, meetings, festivals, conferences, academic weeks and debates cycle.

The International Relations Office
The International Relations Office (ERI) is an advisory component of the Unespar Rectory which aims at establishing relations with foreign, public and private institutions. It aids the academic community in the international cooperation area in order to articulate, support and promote cultural, scientific and technological exchange between Unespar and foreign institutions.

It focuses on supporting the international exchange of students, teachers and technical administrative agents. It promotes the integration of Unespar measures, in partnership with the Dean of Extension, aiming at the internationalization of undergraduate and graduate teaching as well as of research, extension and culture.

Among the partnerships, the Unespar is linked to:

- ZICOSUR - Integrated Zone on the Centre West of South America

- National University Arturo Jauretche - Argentina

- National University of Cuyo - Argentina

- University of Palermo - Argentina

- University of Cauca - Colombia

- National University del Este - Paraguay

- National University of Caaguazú - Paraguay

- National University of Asunción - Paraguay

- National University of Canindeyíu - Paraguay

- University of Beira Interior - Portugal

- Polytechnic Institute of Porto - Portugal

- University of Algarve - Portugal

- Lusophone University of Humanities and Technologies - Portugal

- University of Almeria - Spain

- University of Castilla-La Mancha - Spain

References

Universities and colleges in Paraná
Educational institutions established in 2001
2001 establishments in Brazil
State universities in Brazil
Education in Curitiba
Paranaguá
Paranavaí
União da Vitória
Campo Mourão
Apucarana
São José dos Pinhais